Kuzeh Ali (also Romanized as Kūzeh ‘Alī; also known as Kūzalī) is a village in Shirang Rural District, Kamalan District, Aliabad County, Golestan Province, Iran. At the 2006 census, its population was 386, in 80 families.

References 

Populated places in Aliabad County